Sang or SANG may refer to:

Organizations
Saudi Arabian National Guard, Saudi Arabian military force

Places
Sang, Kerman, a village in Kerman Province, Iran
Sang, Northern Region, a town in Mion District, Northern Region, Ghana
Sang, Seka, a settlement in Seka District, Bueng Kan Province, Thailand
Sang, South Khorasan, a village in South Khorasan Province, Iran
Sang, Uttarakhand, a settlement in Uttarkashi district, Uttarakhand state, India
S'ang District, in Kandal Province, Cambodia

People

Surname
Sang (surname), the romanization of several Chinese surnames
August Sang (1914–1969), Estonian poet and literary translator
Jacob Sang (1720s–1786), 18th-century Dutch glass engraver
Joshua Sang, Kenyan indicted by the International Criminal Court for crimes against humanity
Julius Sang (1948–2004), Kenyan sprinter and 1972 Olympic medallist
Lucas Sang (1961–2008), Kenyan sprinter and 1988 Olympian
Patrick Sang (born 1964), Kenyan steeplechase runner and Olympic and world medallist
Rosemary Chepkorir Sang, Kenyan virologist
Stephen Sang (born 1985), Kenyan politician and current Governor of Nandi County

Given name
Sang (Korean name)
Sang Lee (1954–2004), Korean American three-cushion billiards player
Lin Sang (born 1977), Chinese archer
Sang Phathanothai (1914–1986), Thai politician, union leader, and journalist
Sang Nguyen (born 1960), Australian politician
Sang Yoon, Korean American restaurateur, chef and founder of Father's Office
Yi Sang (1910–1937), Korean writer